Milagros Victoria Crespo Valle (born 4 February 1979 in Cabaiguán) is a Cuban olympic beach volleyballer at the 2008 Summer Olympics. She is partnered with Imara Esteves Ribalta.

Playing with Ion Canet, she won the NORCECA Beach Volleyball Circuit 2009 Manzanillo tournament.

References

External links
 
 
 

1979 births
Living people
Cuban beach volleyball players
Beach volleyball players at the 2008 Summer Olympics
Olympic beach volleyball players of Cuba
Women's beach volleyball players